(1144–1184) was a poet and military leader of the late Heian period of Japan. He was the brother of clan head Taira no Kiyomori, and one of his generals in the Genpei War against the Minamoto.

Career 
Tadanori was the governor of Satsuma and a general in the Genpei War. He was also a well versed poet and a student of the famous poet Fujiwara no Shunzei.

Genpei War 

Tadnori took part in the Battle of Fujigawa of the Genpei War. He also fought against Minamoto no Yoshinaka in the Battle of Kurikara. According to the Tale of the Heike, before fleeing the capital after a loss to the Minamoto, he visited Fujiwara no Shunzei to deliver a "hundred or so" poems. Shunzei included one anonymously in the Senzaishu. The poem read:

Death 
He died in the Battle of Ichi-no-Tani. His body was identified by a signed poem that was fastened to his quiver. The poem read:

See also 
 Zeami Motokiyo – playwright who wrote  the Noh play Tadanori which focuses on Tadanori's spirit and his desire to have his anonymous poem attributed.

References

 Turnbull, Stephen (1998). The Samurai Sourcebook. London: Cassell & Co.

Taira clan
1144 births
1184 deaths
Japanese warriors killed in battle
People of Heian-period Japan